Ganta is a town in the Coalla Department of Gnagna Province in eastern Burkina Faso. In 2005 the town had an estimated population of 2,465.

References

External links
Satellite map at Maplandia.com

Populated places in the Est Region (Burkina Faso)
Gnagna Province